The Centre for Genomic Pathogen Surveillance is a computational genomics research institute in Oxfordshire.

History
The Centre for Genomic Pathogen Surveillance opened in 2015 as a joint project between Imperial College London and Wellcome Sanger Institute. In 2017 it was announced that the centre would house a new Global Health Research Unit funded by the National Institute for Health Research (NIHR) to look at antibiotic resistance. This has seen the centre becoming involved with surveillance of antibiotic resistance in a number of countries, for example, the Philippines.

From 2018 to 2021 the Wellcome Sanger Institute and University of Oxford co-hosted the CGPS. From September 2021 the CGPS has been based at the University of Oxford. 

During the COVID-19 pandemic, the centre received funding as part of the COG-UK consortium.

On 22nd September 2022 it was announced that the Centre for Genomic Pathogen Surveillance, part of the Big Data Institute at the University of Oxford, was awarded funding worth £7m for their work as an NIHR Global Health Research Unit (GHRU) for the next five years. The Centre’s research and capacity building work focuses on delivering genomics and enabling data for the surveillance of antimicrobial resistance (AMR).

Structure
The centre's director is David Aanensen.

The centre is principally funded, and directed, by the Department of Health and Social Care. In 2019, it was agreed that there would be collaboration between the Centre for Genomic Pathogen Surveillance, the European Centre for Disease Prevention and Control, and the Wellcome Sanger Institute, towards improving the monitoring and tracking of infectious diseases across Europe.

Applications created at the centre
Under the auspices of the centre, the Epicollect5 (used for data entry from distributed observers, e.g. by 'citizen science' programs), Microreact, and Pathogenwatch applications have been generated and shared. Microreact has seen extensive use during the COVID-19 pandemic, and is a component of the Phylogenetic Assignment of Named Global Outbreak Lineages (pangolin) software tool.

Location
The centre is located at the Big Data Institute, Nuffield Department of Medicine, University of Oxford

See also
 List of phylogenetic tree visualization software
 Microbial Genomics
 Ineos Oxford Institute for AMR Research
 Virus Pathogen Database and Analysis Resource

References

External links
 CGPS
 Latest News | Centre for Genomic Pathogen Surveillance hosted at GitLab.com

2015 establishments in the United Kingdom
Antimicrobial resistance organizations
Big data
Bioinformatics organizations
Computational phylogenetics
DNA sequencing
Genetics in the United Kingdom
Genetics or genomics research institutions
Genomics organizations
Health informatics in the United Kingdom
Health informatics organizations
Information technology organisations based in the United Kingdom
Medical genetics
Pathogen genomics
Public health genomics
Research institutes in Cambridgeshire
South Cambridgeshire District
Wellcome Trust